Vladimir Nikolayevich Marchenko (Russian: Владимир Николаевич Марченко, born 22 September 1952), is a Russian former gymnast who competed in the 1976 Summer Olympics.

References

1952 births
Living people
Russian male artistic gymnasts
Soviet male artistic gymnasts
Olympic gymnasts of the Soviet Union
Gymnasts at the 1976 Summer Olympics
Olympic silver medalists for the Soviet Union
Olympic medalists in gymnastics
Medalists at the 1976 Summer Olympics
Medalists at the World Artistic Gymnastics Championships
20th-century Russian people